Serco Group plc is a British multinational defence, justice & immigration, transport, health, and citizen services company.  It is headquartered in Hook, Hampshire, England. The company also operates in Continental Europe, the Middle East, the Asia Pacific region (including Australia and Hong Kong), and North America. Serco employs approximately 50,000 people worldwide and manages over 500 contracts.

Serco is one of the largest companies in the sector of delivering public services under government contracts. Approximately 55% of the company's revenue is generated from overseas; with revenue in citizen services (31%), defence (29%), justice and immigration (18%), health (12%), and transport (10%).

It is listed on the London Stock Exchange and is a constituent of the FTSE 250 Index.

History 

Serco was founded in 1929 as RCA Services Limited, a United Kingdom division of the Radio Corporation of America and initially provided services to the cinema industry.

RCA Services Limited began providing services to governments after during World War 2. After the onset of the war, RCA Services was contracted by the British War Office due to the company's engineering and technical background to supply the department with equipment which would simulate the sound of warfare to confuse the enemy. In 1952, RCA Services was contracted to produce submarine-detecting sonar equipment for the US Navy. In 1960 RCA Services were awarded the contract to design, install, and maintain the UK Ministry of Defence's Ballistic Missile Early Warning System, including ongoing facility management such as cleaning, transport, and logistical stores.

Following the takeover of RCA by General Electric in late 1985, RCA Services Limited was bought out by its local management. It changed its name to Serco in 1987 and has been a London Stock Exchange listed company since 1988.

On 29 December 2008, Serco acquired SI International.

In November 2014 its share price, which stood at 674p before the taxpayer scandal broke in 2013 collapsed to 218.7p, after four profit warnings. The new chief executive Rupert Soames sold off "scores of divisions". He said the company was suffering from ministers’ improved ability at driving a bargain, and claimed that "the Government has got much more adept at writing contracts and transferring risk to the private sector". On 17 November 2014, it was announced that Alastair Lyons would resign from his position as chairman of Serco. Lyons referred to "operational mis-steps" for which he took "ultimate responsibility", but said he had not been forced out. Serco made a loss of £991million in 2014, reducing to a loss of £69.4million in 2015.

John Rishton was appointed as Non-Executive Chairman in Spring 2021, succeeding Sir Roy Gardner who held the position from May 2015. Rishton had been on the Board since September 2016. In September 2017, Serco announced that it would be combining its UK and Europe operations.

In August 2022, Serco announced that it would distribute £9million in one-off payments to about 45,000 non-management staff as the firm lifted its profit guidance and dividend. The sum equated to around £200 for each of its 45,000 workers.

UK operations

Defence 

Serco held defence contracts in 2004, including the UK Government's contract for the maintenance of the Ballistic Missile Early Warning System at RAF Fylingdales with their contract being extended by the UK Ministry of Defence in October 2022 for three years which will see them providing maintenance, repair, and operational services for the radar in Yorkshire, England; contracts are also held for the operation and maintenance of RAF Brize Norton, RAF Halton, RAF Northolt and RNAS Culdrose in the UK and RAF Ascension Island in the mid-Atlantic. Serco also provides support services to garrisons in Australia. Serco also manages many aspects of operations at the Defence Academy of the United Kingdom in Shrivenham. Serco was one of three partners in the consortium who managed the Atomic Weapons Establishment until June 2021 when it was taken over by the MOD: in July 2015 the Office for Nuclear Regulation issued an improvement notice to the consortium demanding that it demonstrate that it has a long-term strategy for managing Higher Active radioactive Waste in order to reduce the risk to the public and its employees.

Serco is a major subcontractor to Airbus Defence and Space on the Skynet military communications satellites PFI contract.

Serco Marine Services is responsible for fleet support at the three main UK naval bases, HMNB Portsmouth, HMNB Devonport and HMNB Clyde. In November 2022, the UK Ministry of Defence (MoD) awarded Serco a £200million follow-on contract, lasting 27months, to provide marine services for the Royal Navy.

Transport 

In London, Serco has operated the London Cycle Hire Scheme for Transport for London since it was first introduced in 2010. In December 2022, Serco signed a three-year contract extension valued at £50million to continue maintaining and distributing the bikes, including the newly introduced e-Bikes.

Serco has operated a number of train operating companies. It has a 50% shareholding in Serco-Abellio that has a concession to operate the Merseyrail franchise in Liverpool until 2028, and previously operated the Northern Rail franchise from December 2004 until March 2016. Serco has a contract in its own right to operate the Caledonian Sleeper between London and Scotland until 25 June 2023,
when the service will be taken into public ownership by Transport Scotland.

In 1997 Serco purchased the Railtest business as part of the privatisation of British Rail. Included in the sale was a management contract for the Old Dalby Test Track. From 1997 until 2004, Serco operated the National Rail Enquiry Service under contract to the Association of Train Operating Companies. It maintains Network Rail's fleet of infrastructure and maintenance trains at the Railway Technical Centre.

In Scotland, Serco has operated the NorthLink Ferries ferry service since July 2012. In September 2018 it commenced operating a bicycle-sharing system under contract to Transport for Edinburgh which closed in September 2021.

Serco's Home Affairs division operates speed camera systems throughout the UK and, until November 2013, designed, wrote and tested the software that controls the matrix message signs, signals, emergency roadside telephones (SOS) and traffic monitoring on England's motorway network including, until 2011, the National Traffic Control Centre.

Serco previously operated the Docklands Light Railway in London from 1997 until 2014.

Border security 

Serco was part of a consortium called Trusted Borders, led by Raytheon Systems Limited, to put in place e-Borders under a contract awarded by the UK Home Office in 2007. As a subcontractor to Raytheon, Serco was responsible for delivering the infrastructure and service management of e-Borders; Raytheon had its contract terminated in July 2010 and Serco at the time stated it had fulfilled all its commitments on the contract.

Work and pensions 

Serco is contracted to the Department for Work and Pensions (DWP) to provide telephone advice on behalf of DWP to recipients of Support for Mortgage Interest (SMI), which ends in April 2018.

Science 

Serco managed the UK's National Physical Laboratory until 2015 and also provides IT Services, Industrial Support and Cryogenic Operations Support and Maintenance at CERN. Serco also was part of a consortium running the UK's National Nuclear Laboratory under contract, until October 2013.

Prisons and justice 

In Britain Serco supplies electronic tagging devices for offenders and asylum seekers. Serco, as well as its rival G4S, was accused of overcharging the Ministry of Justice on its contract to tag offenders. The firm issued a profit warning for 2014 as a result of the costs of becoming embroiled in an electronic tagging scandal. Serco repaid £68.5million to the government for its overcharging on the contract. In May 2014 a Survation poll for campaign group We Own It, found that 63% of respondents thought Serco should be banned from bidding for any new public contracts after the firm was investigated for overcharging on government contracts.

It runs four prisons, a Young Offenders Institution and a Secure Training Centre. It has also operated two Immigration Removal Centres since 2007. Serco is also responsible for the contracted-out court escort services in the south-east area (formerly a role undertaken by HM Prison Service).

In September 2013, Serco was accused of an extensive cover-up over sexual abuse at Yarl's Wood Immigration Removal Centre in Bedfordshire, England In August 2014, Serco was criticised for using immigrant detainees as cheap labour, with some being paid as little as £1 per hour. The decision to give the firm a new £70million eight-year contract to run Yarl's Wood has been criticised. Natasha Walter, of Women for Refugee Women, said
"Serco is clearly unfit to manage a centre where vulnerable women are held and it is unacceptable the government continues to entrust Serco with the safety of women who are survivors of sexual violence."

A fine of £19.2million was imposed on Serco following the delayed legal action that began in 2013, for fraud and false accounting over its electronic tagging service for the Ministry of Justice. Serco was also ordered to pay the full amount of the Serious Fraud Office's investigative costs (£3.7m). In his judgment, Mr Justice Davis said: "SGL (Serco Geografix Ltd) engaged in quite deliberate fraud against the Ministry of Justice in relation to the provision of services vital to the criminal justice system." The charged ex-directors of firm's subsidiary were cleared of fraud and false accounting in April 2021 as the SFO had failed to disclose certain documents to the defense, resulting in issues, which, according to the judge "undermine the process of disclosure to the extent that the trial cannot safely and fairly proceed until they have been remedied".

In 2022 the company supplied food containing maggots to children in a hotel in the Midlands. It subsequently apologised and said it would visit the hotel.

Housing 

In Glasgow, in August 2018, it was disclosed that Serco had been planning to evict asylum seekers before their appeal procedure was completed. Lawyers questioned whether this was legal under Scottish law. Two asylum seekers started hunger striking.  Serco confirmed that it was serving a notice of eviction on many tenants causing alarm and lawyers challenged one asylum seeker's eviction at the Scottish Court of Session.  Councillor Jennifer Layden, equalities and human rights convener for Glasgow, said, "The lock change announcement by the Home Office and Serco has caused widespread fear and alarm among asylum seekers in Glasgow. There is confusion and panic among the community – some of whom have limited English and who may not be affected by Serco’s announcement. Both Serco and the Home Office have a responsibility to put this vulnerable group at ease".

In January 2019, it was reported that Serco had lost the contract to provide housing to asylum seekers in Glasgow.

A Freedom of Information request by the Scottish Refugee Council showed that Serco had been charged nearly £3million by the Home Office for repeatedly breaching its contract to house asylum seekers in Glasgow and Northern Ireland.

Aviation 

Serco also operate Scatsta Airport in Shetland. In June 2010, Serco signed a £4million contract to operate all air traffic control services for Coventry Airport.

Health 

Serco provide facilities management services at the Norfolk and Norwich University Hospital, Leicester Royal Infirmary, and Wishaw General Hospital.

The company had the contract for out-of-hours GP services in Cornwall from which it withdrew in December 2013 after the company left the county short of doctors. The company also said it would stop running Braintree hospital in Essex as it pulled out of managing GP services and large hospitals.

In health services, Serco's failures include the poor handling of pathology labs and fatal errors in patient records. At St Thomas' Hospital, the increase in the number of clinical incidents arising from Serco non-clinical management has resulted in patients receiving incorrect and infected blood, as well as patients suffering kidney damage due to Serco providing incorrect data used for medical calculations. A Serco employee later revealed that the company had falsified 252 reports to the National Health Service regarding Serco health services in Cornwall.

It emerged in November 2013, that Serco, which won a contract for Suffolk Community Healthcare in 2012, had 72 vacancies after earlier cutting 137 posts. Problems identified by Ipswich and East Suffolk Clinical Commissioning Group include "staff capacity, skill mix, workload, succession planning and morale, training, communication, mobile working, care co-ordination centre processes, incidents and near miss incidents".

In April 2014, Serco revealed that it would lose almost £18million on three of its NHS contracts. The firm has made provisions for losses in its Braintree and Cornwall contracts, which were cancelled early. It has also made provisions for losses in its contract for services in Suffolk. The company claims it will take longer to deliver the operational efficiencies it hoped for, despite saying in May 2013 that it expected to make a profit on the three-year, £140million contract for community services. It said that staff had not recorded activity accurately on the Electronic health record and that activity had increased significantly during the course of the contract.

In August 2014 it was reported that the company had decided to withdraw from the clinical health services market in the UK after a review of the cost of delivering "improved service levels" and meeting the performance requirements of several existing contracts.

On 24 October 2017, it was reported that Serco was preparing to buy healthcare contracts from facilities management business Carillion. The deal included 15 contracts, with annual revenues of approximately £90milliuon, for which Serco would pay £47.7million, with Carillion losing £1billion from the value of its order book.

In May 2020, Serco accidentally shared the personal email addresses of nearly 300 trainee COVID-19 contact tracers.

Education 

Serco held a ten-year contract with Bradford City Council between 2001 and 2011 to manage and operate the local education authority, providing education support services to the city's schools. This period was marked with "real problems" according to senior council officials and was taken back in house by the local authority after this period. Serco similarly manages and operates Walsall and Stoke-on-Trent local education authorities. Serco is one of Ofsted's three Regional Inspection Service Providers, responsible for school inspections in the English Midlands.

Leisure 

Serco Leisure Operating Ltd works with clients throughout the UK, running gyms, swimming pools, cycle hire schemes and National Sports Centres.

Information technology 

Serco administered the publicly funded UK Business Link website from 2005 until its closure in 2012. It won a five-year tender in 2007 to run the IT Infrastructure for the London Borough of Southwark.

Waste and recycling services 

Serco also operates recycling and waste collection services for local councils.

Outside the UK

Canada 

Serco, through a purpose-made division Serco DES, holds a ten-year, $114 million contract with the Ministry of Transportation of Ontario to operate the Ontario's DriveTest driver examination centres. These tests include vision, road, and knowledge tests for all persons seeking to become a licensed automobile driver in the province.

United States 

In July 2013 Serco was awarded a US$1.25billion contract to manage the implementation of the Patient Protection and Affordable Care Act, which makes Serco one of the most highly paid government contractors in the US.

Serco does the classification for all incoming US patents.

Serco has a contract with the City of Chicago, Illinois, to enforce parking meter regulations.

Serco provides air traffic control services at airports and some smaller airports in the United States and Canada. Starting in 2004 Serco had a £5million a year contract from the US government to manage airports in Iraq for 18months.

New Zealand 
In Auckland, New Zealand, Serco operated the Mount Eden remand prison and in March 2012 was awarded a contract to build and operate a 960-bed prison at Wiri. Serco was heavily criticized for the existence of 'fight clubs' within Mount Eden prison that were not investigated until after they became public knowledge on 16 July 2015 when footage emerged online and was reported by TVNZ. On 24 July 2015, Serco's contract to run the Mount Eden prison was revoked and operation was given back to the New Zealand Department of Corrections. Serco was ordered to pay NZ$8million to the New Zealand government as a result of problems at Mount Eden Prison while it was under Serco's management. The New Zealand government did not accept that this was a failure of governmental contracting and oversight. It brought in correctional officers from afar to provide adequate staffing at Mount Eden, and by December 2016 had spent NZ$2million housing up to 40 of them in Auckland hotels.

Australia

Transport
From 1996 until 2005, Serco operated TransAdelaide bus services in Adelaide. In November 1995 Serco commenced a contract to provide transport information services for Transperth and in May 1996, a contract to maintain all of its bus stations.

From 1997 until 2015, Serco owned Great Southern Rail that operated The Ghan, Indian Pacific and The Overland passenger trains. In March 2015, the business was sold to Allegro Funds.

In Sydney, Serco has operated transport information services for Transport for NSW since 1 July 2010.

Justice and Immigration
, Serco operates Acacia Prison in Western Australia, Australia's largest prison facility, as well as the Adelaide Remand Centre in South Australia.  Serco and its subcontractor, MSS Security, have been criticised for abuses.

It ran the Borallon Correctional Centre in Queensland for 22 years between 1990 and 2012, and Wandoo Reintegration Facility in Western Australia from 2012 to 2018.

It has also had the national contract for various immigration detention centres since 2009, including Christmas Island and the Villawood detention centre in Sydney. The Union of Christmas Island Workers highlighted the systemic failure by Serco to manage the Christmas Island Immigration Reception and Processing Centre. The centre detained a large number of refugees at its peak around 2013, including 1,000 children. Under Serco, there was an increase of deaths in custody and self-harm in the years leading up to 2013, as well as a deterioration of facilities, leading to the decline of the physical and the mental health of detainees and of staff. Ombudsman Allan Asher said "In the first week of June when I visited Christmas Island, more than 30 incidents of self-harm by detainees held there were reported". Serco, in a staged memo leaked to The Australian, blamed the detainees for "creating a culture of self-harm", in order to use it as a "bargaining tool". The former manager of the detention centre stated the centre was grossly understaffed.

Europe 

Serco formerly operated the Copenhagen Metro in Copenhagen, Denmark, with Ansaldo STS, until it sold its share with effect on 1 January 2008.

Serco runs partly privatised Hünfeld Prison in Hesse, Germany.

Serco secured an eight-year contract in 2013 with its Swedish joint venture partner Strömma Tourism & Maritime to operate four Djurgården ferries on behalf of Stockholm County Council and public ferry company Waxholms Ångfartygs.

Serco manages the United Nations' Earth observation space programme, the Copernicus Programme.

Hong Kong 

Hong Kong's Cross-Harbour Tunnel operations has been contracted out to Serco since 2010.

Mauritius 

The 2017 Paradise Papers revealed that Appleby carried out a risk assessment of Serco and noted it had a "history of problems, failures, fatal errors and overcharging" and had faced allegations of fraud and cover-ups.

United Arab Emirates 
Serco provides air traffic control services at international airports in the United Arab Emirates. Serco operates the Dubai Metro and continues to operate the Dubai Tram and the Palm Jumeirah Monorail in Dubai.

References

External links 

 
 

1929 establishments in England
British companies established in 1929
Business services companies established in 1929
Business services companies of England
Business services companies of the United Kingdom
Companies based in Hampshire
Companies listed on the London Stock Exchange
Defence companies of the United Kingdom
Health care companies of the United Kingdom
Private prisons in the United Kingdom
Private providers of NHS services
RCA
Serco
Workfare in the United Kingdom